Central Romana Port is located in Romana River, La Romana, Dominican Republic, and belongs to Central Romana Corporation, which is a private company established in 1911 and has the largest sugar mill in the country.

Overview

Port of La Romana is private property and is supervised by the Dominican Port Authority.
It was built in the 1950s by Gulf+Western (today Central Romana Corporation).

This harbor was formerly only for exportation of the sugar mill, but in consequence of the tourism development in the Dominican Republic, Central Romana Corp. decided to add a new tourism terminal to carry people to the Catalina Island from there.
And the  Casa de Campo International Airport made it easier for tourists to come to La Romana

The port has two terminals, whose names are Muelle Comercial (Commercial Harbor) and Terminal Turistica (Tourist Terminal), and its main operations are general cargo, container cargo, ferries, cruise, fuel/diesel and sugar mill exportation.

See also 
 List of ports and harbours of the Atlantic Ocean

Port information
 Location: 
 Local time: UTC−4 
 Weather/climate/prevailing winds:  From May 15 until September 15
 Climate: mostly sunny, tropical. Hurricane  season runs from June to November
 Prevailing winds: direction ENE–ESE
 Average temperature range: 28–30 °C

References 

 Central Romana Port (Spanish)

Ports and harbours of the Dominican Republic
Urban planning in the Dominican Republic
La Romana, Dominican Republic